Karen Ruth Hurd (née Willa; born 1958) is an American nutritionist, writer, and Republican politician from Eau Claire County, Wisconsin.  She is a member of the Wisconsin State Assembly, representing Wisconsin's 68th Assembly district since January 2023.  She is also currently a member of the village board of Fall Creek, Wisconsin.

Biography
Karen Hurd was born Karen Willa in Texas.  Her parents divorced when she was a child, and she moved to Missouri, where she graduated from Kirkwood High School in 1976.  She went on to attend Truman State University, where she earned her bachelor's degree in 1980.  While attending school, she was involved in the Reserve Officers' Training Corps and was commissioned a second lieutenant in the United States Army at the time she graduated from college.  She served four years in the Army, and was discharged with the rank of captain in 1984.  She received the Army Commendation Medal for outstanding service.  

For the next several years after leaving the Army, she was focused on her growing family and resided in St. Louis, Missouri.  In 1989, after her infant daughter was poisoned by a household pesticide (Organophosphate) she began studying alternative treatment options to help restore her daughter's health.  She administered a nutrition plan, and the child recovered and grew to adulthood with no apparent ill effects.  

The experience led her to pursue further education in nutrition and biology.  She attended the American Academy of Nutrition (now Huntington University of Health Sciences) and received a diploma of comprehensive nutrition in 1994, after which she established a nutrition practice,  Nutrition Practice LLC.  

In the late 1990s, she moved to Fall Creek, Wisconsin, with her family.  She continued to pursue higher education, attending several courses at the University of Wisconsin–Eau Claire, and ultimately completed her master's degree in biochemistry in 2017 from the University of Saint Joseph.

She has been an outspoken advocate on nutrition issues, and has appeared on radio and speaking platforms to discuss her findings.  She has also self-published three books on the subject and volumes of digital coursework.

She is currently pursuing a master's in public health from George Washington University.  She has also recently worked as a substitute teacher in the Fall Creek School System.

In addition to her pursuits in nutrition and medicine, Hurd has been a playwright since 1997 and has produced more than 40 plays and musicals through her Scene & Hurd Productions LLC production company.  She also wrote and produced the feature film The Lumber Baron (2019) about a family lumber business in early 20th century Wisconsin. She has also published a long-running historical fiction column in a Wisconsin newspaper.

Political career
Karen Hurd was elected to her first public office in 2021, when she joined the village board of trustees of Fall Creek.

The next year, incumbent Wisconsin state representative Jesse James announced he would run for Wisconsin State Senate, creating an open seat in the 68th Assembly district. Three days later, Hurd announced her candidacy for the Republican nomination to succeed James. Ultimately two other candidates would enter the Republican contest, but Hurd prevailed with 57% of the vote in the primary. She defeated Eau Claire County supervisor Nate Otto in the general election, receiving 61% of the vote.  

She will assume office in January 2023.

Personal life and family
Karen Willa was one of four children born to James L. Willa and his wife Betty (née Duncan).  Though her parents divorced, they both ultimately ended up moving to western Wisconsin.

Karen Willa took the last name Hurd when she married Steven Hurd in 1978.  They now reside in Fall Creek, Wisconsin; they have five adult children and four grandchildren.

Electoral history

Wisconsin Assembly (2022)

| colspan="6" style="text-align:center;background-color: #e9e9e9;"| Republican Primary, August 9, 2022

| colspan="6" style="text-align:center;background-color: #e9e9e9;"| General Election, November 8, 2022

Published works

References

External links
 Campaign website
 Business website
 
 
 Karen Hurd at Wisconsin Vote

1958 births
Living people
Republican Party members of the Wisconsin State Assembly 
Women state legislators in Wisconsin 
People from Kirkwood, Missouri
People from Eau Claire County, Wisconsin
Truman State University alumni
University of Saint Joseph (Connecticut) alumni
21st-century American women politicians
21st-century American dramatists and playwrights
Screenwriters from Wisconsin
American nutritionists
United States Army officers